Scipio Center is a hamlet in Cayuga County, New York, United States. Scipio Center has a post office with ZIP code 13147, which opened on February 20, 1934.

References

Hamlets in Cayuga County, New York
Hamlets in New York (state)